The Natural Law Party of Canada fielded several candidates in the 2000 federal election, none of whom were elected.  Information about these candidates may be found here.

Quebec (incomplete)

Ontario

Eglinton—Lawrence: Matthew Macleod

Macleod is a musician.  He has released an album entitled Comedies, Histories, Tragedies, and performed a solo concert at EcoFair 2003 (organized by the Maharishi University of Management).  He received 133 votes (0.32%), finishing seventh against Liberal incumbent Joe Volpe.

Hamilton East: Helene Anne Darisse

Darisse, also called Helene Darisse-Yildirim, is a teacher and video producer from the Niagara Falls area.  She holds Bachelor of Education and Master of Arts degrees (Canada NewsWire, 17 December 2000), and is a member of the Ontario Straw Bale Building Coalition , and the Canadian Yoga Alliance.

Darisse was a perennial candidate for the Natural Law Party at both the federal and provincial levels.

Hamilton West: Rita Rassenberg

Rassenberg was born in Switzerland, and moved to Canada in her 20s.  She has worked as an office administrator, bookkeeper, sales manager and real-estate estate (Hamilton Spectator, 16 November 2000).

She was a frequent candidate for the Natural Law Party at both the provincial and federal levels.

Lanark—Carleton: Britt Roberts

Roberts was a perennial candidate for the Natural Law Party.  He campaigned in the federal elections of 1993, 1997 and 2000, and also campaigned for the Natural Law Party of Ontario in 1999.

Roberts became active in transcendental meditation while attending the University of Toronto, and studied yogic flying at a Natural Law conference in the United States in 1983.  He completed a Master of Business Administration degree in Iowa, and moved to Ottawa in 1994.  Roberts has been active in the Maharishi Global Development Fund.

During the 1999 provincial election, Roberts described the Natural Law Party's development as follows: "It's about providing a new paradigm. In the first stage, people just ignore it, and then they ridicule. Then, they admit that they agreed with it all along. We may still be at the early stages of that process, but it is coming."  He was 45 years old at the time (Kingston Whig-Standard, 29 May 1999).

Niagara Falls: Bill Amos
William Norman Amos was a property manager and real-estate salesperson in Niagara Falls. He began practising transcendental meditation in 1974, and later became active with the Maharishi Mahesh Yogi's international network. He ran for the Natural Law Party of Canada four times and the Natural Law Party of Ontario twice, and was involved in the proposed Maharishi Veda Land Canada theme park in his home city.

While running in a federal by-election in 1996, Amos argued that there was scientific proof that regular meditation by one per cent of the population would bring about a reduction in crime and unemployment rates. He also promised to eliminate Canada's Goods and Services Tax, and suggested the introduction of a thirty per cent flat tax to eliminate Canada's deficit and debt (with the understanding that the rate would be reduced after such time). When asked for his opinion on Canada's Young Offenders Act, he said that he would promote meditation in youth jails to reduce crime. He was forty-nine years old at the time.

Ottawa—Vanier: Pierrette J. Blondin

Blondin has a Master of Education degree.  She was a frequent candidate for the NLP at the provincial and federal levels.  During the 1995 provincial election, she described herself as having twenty-eight years' experience as a teacher in the Ottawa-Carleton French School Board, and fifteen years' experience with transcendental meditation.

St. Catharines: Jim Morris

Morris listed himself as the lead hand at Dominion Controls.  He was a frequent candidate for the NLP at the provincial and federal levels.

Toronto Centre—Rosedale: David Gordon

David Gordon is an advertising executive, and was based in Toronto during the period of his federal campaigns.  He gave demonstrations in "yogic flying" during the 1993 federal election, and argued that the Natural Law Party would allow young Canadians to "gain enlightenment and perfection in their own lives and at the same time materialize their noble sentiments for an ideal civilization in Canada".

He ran for the Natural Law Party of Canada twice and was a candidate for the Natural Law Party of Ontario in 1995.

References